Naeem Zamindar is a Pakistani businessman. He served as CEO of Acumen Pakistan from April 2015 to November 2017 and as chairman of Pakistan Board of Investment with the status of Minister of State from November 2017 to June 2018.

Career
He was one of the founding team members of Mobilink where he served as head of the company's Broadband Business Division and as CSO.

He became CEO of Wateen in December 2010 and left the office in July 2014.

In April 2015, he became Pakistan Country Director of Acumen where he continued to serve until being appointed as chairman of Pakistan Board of Investment (BoI) in November 2017, with the status of Minister of State in the federal cabinet of Prime Minister Shahid Khaqan Abbasi.

During his term as chairman BoI, 75 reforms were completed. He continue to serve in the office until resigning in June 2018 due to personal reasons.

References

Living people
Place of birth missing (living people)
Pakistani businesspeople
Year of birth missing (living people)
Pakistani chief executives